Simulated presence therapy is an emotion-oriented non-pharmacological intervention for people with dementia. It is based in psychological attachment theories and is normally carried out playing a recording with voices of the closest relatives of the patient. It is not clear if simulated presence therapy is effective.

References 

Alzheimer's disease
Aging-associated diseases
Neurological disorders